The Powerhouse is a historic building located on the campus of California Polytechnic State University in San Luis Obispo, California. Built from 1909 to 1910, it is the oldest building still standing at Cal Poly. 

The design of the building was long mis-attributed to William H. Weeks, who had designed the original Cal Poly power house at the northern end of campus. However, the architectural plans for the 1909 building were created by the State of California Department of Engineering, under State Engineer Nat Ellery. 

The building is designed in the Mission Revival style. The building originally served as a power plant run by students and two full-time supervisors; it also held Mechanics and Electrical Engineering classes. The Powerhouse stopped generating power in the 1940s and was replaced entirely and abandoned in 1955. In 1967, the building found a new use when the school's College of Architecture and Environmental Design decided to hold classes there. The college continued to hold classes in the building even after the construction of a new architecture building, and only stopped in 1990 when the school's administration ordered the building to be abandoned.

The Powerhouse was added to the National Register of Historic Places on July 30, 1993.

References

External links

Buildings and structures in San Luis Obispo, California
California Polytechnic State University
Energy infrastructure on the National Register of Historic Places
National Register of Historic Places in San Luis Obispo County, California
University and college buildings on the National Register of Historic Places in California
Mission Revival architecture in California